Gaetano Borriello (1958–2015) was an American computer scientist and researcher in ubiquitous computing. He is known for starting the Open Data Kit project and as the founding director of Intel Research Seattle. The Place Lab project he led at Intel Research using Wi-Fi to enhance location sensing is now the dominant approach in use by Apple, Google, Microsoft, and others.

Borriello was named a Fellow of the ACM in 2009 "for the design, realization, and integration of embedded and ubiquitous computing systems" and of the IEEE in 2010 "for contributions to embedded computing devices and systems."  He was also a Fulbright Scholar.

Borriello was on the University of Washington computer science faculty from 1988 until his death – 27 years.  The Gaetano Borriello Endowed Fellowship for Change was funded by Borriello's friends on his untimely death, to provide support for UW students "whose work is focused on exploring how technology can improve the lives of underserved populations".

References

External links

 Remembering Gaetano Borriello talk by Randy Katz

Italian emigrants to the United States
Polytechnic Institute of New York University alumni
Stanford University alumni
University of California, Berkeley alumni
Scientists at PARC (company)
University of Washington faculty
Fellows of the Association for Computing Machinery
Fellow Members of the IEEE
Ubiquitous computing researchers
2015 deaths